Kenoy Wayne Kennedy (born November 15, 1977 in Dallas, Texas) is a former American football safety in the National Football League (NFL). He was drafted by the Denver Broncos in the second round of the 2000 NFL Draft and also played for the Detroit Lions. He played college football at Arkansas.

College career
Kennedy signed with Arkansas in the 1996 recruiting class out of Terrell High School in Terrell, TX as a defensive back. He was recruited by then-head coach Danny Ford. Kennedy was a back-up at free safety his freshman year in 1996, then earned the starting job in 1997. Ford was fired after the "97 season and Houston Nutt was hired as the new head coach. 

Kennedy was a mainstay in the Razorback secondary by 1998, helping Arkansas win a share of the SEC West Division championship. Kennedy earned 2nd Team All-SEC honors for a 9-3 Arkansas squad in "98. In 1999, Kennedy was named to the Coaches Poll 1st Team All-SEC squad, and was again SEC 2nd Team AP. His big-time hits and solid tackling helped the Razorbacks beat the Texas Longhorns in the 2000 Cotton Bowl Classic on an 8-4 team. It was Arkansas' first bowl victory since 1985 and their first Cotton Bowl win since 1976.

Professional career

Denver Broncos
He was drafted in the second round by the Denver Broncos in 2000 and played five seasons with the team before becoming a free agent in 2005.

Detroit Lions
Kennedy signed with the Detroit Lions in the 2005 offseason. He played three seasons with the team before being released on March 14, 2008.

NFL statistics

References

1977 births
Living people
Players of American football from Dallas
American football safeties
Arkansas Razorbacks football players
Denver Broncos players
Detroit Lions players